Lipovica is a village in the municipality of Leskovac, Serbia. In 2002, the village has a population of 1287  people.

References

Populated places in Jablanica District